Sheehy is a surname. Notable people with the surname include:

Politicians
 David Sheehy, 19th-century Irish nationalist politician
 Gerry Sheehy (1924–2009), Canadian politician
 Mary Sheehy Moe, Democratic member of the Montana Legislature
 Maurie Sheehy, (1893–1961), Australian politician
 Michael Sheehy is a Democratic member of the Ohio House of Representatives
 Paul J. Sheehy, American politician
 Rick Sheehy, disgraced Nebraskan politician
 Thomas Sheehy (1899–1984), Labor member of the Australian House of Representatives
 Timothy Sheehy (Cork politician), Irish politician
 Timothy Sheehy (Tipperary politician), Irish politician

Sports
 Ciara Sheehy (born 1980), Irish 200m sprinter
 Joan McSheehy (1913–1948), American swimmer
 John Joe Sheehy, Irish political/military activist and sportsperson
 Kathy Sheehy (born 1970), American water polo player
 Mikey Sheehy, Gaelic footballer
 Neil Sheehy, retired American ice hockey player
 Niall Sheehy, Irish Gaelic footballer
 Noel Sheehy, Irish hurling
 Paudie Sheehy, Gaelic footballer
 Paul Sheehy, American rugby player
 Seán Óg Sheehy (born 1939), Irish former Gaelic footballer
 Sean Sheehy (born 1952), Irish soccer player
 Timothy Sheehy (ice hockey), retired ice hockey player
 Damon Sheehy-Guiseppi (born 1995), American football player

Activists
 Nicholas Sheehy, 18th-century Irish Catholic priest and opponent of the Penal Laws
 Eugene Sheehy (priest), 19th-century Irish nationalist priest
 Francis Sheehy-Skeffington, born Francis Skeffington (1878–1916), Irish writer and political activist, husband of Hanna Sheehy-Skeffington
 Hanna Sheehy-Skeffington, born Hanna Sheehy (1877–1946), Irish nationalist and women's activist, wife of Francis Sheehy-Skeffington
 Owen Sheehy-Skeffington (1909–1970), Irish university lecturer and Senator, son of Francis and Hanna Sheehy-Skeffington

Business
 Eugene Sheehy (banker), group chief executive of Allied Irish Banks Plc
 Sir Christopher Sheehy OBE (1894–1960), Australian dairy industry administrator
 Sir Patrick Sheehy (1930–2019), British businessman

Writers
 Gail Sheehy, (1937–2020), American author
 Eugene P. Sheehy, retired academic librarian, professional researcher, author and editor

Judges
 The Honourable Sir Joseph Sheehy KBE, (1900–1971), Australian jurist and Supreme Court Justice
 Joseph Warren Sheehy, (1910–1967), United States federal judge

Other
 Brett Sheehy AO, (born 1958), Australian artistic director, producer and curator
 Lieutenant General Sir Henry Sheehy Keating KCB (1775–1847), officer of the British Army during the French Revolutionary and Napoleonic Wars
 Jeremy Sheehy (born 1956), British Anglican priest and academic
 John Sheehy (administrator) (1889–1949), British colonial official
 John Sheehy (architect) (born 1942), internationally known American architect
 Suzie Sheehy, Australian accelerator physicist and science communicator

Fictional characters
 Father Sheehy, the liberal catholic priest, played by Tony Doyle (actor), in the Irish TV drama The Riordans
 Francis Sheehy-Skeffington, an Irish drug trafficker played by Liam Cunningham in the 2011 film The Guard

Surnames of Irish origin
Anglicised Irish-language surnames